"Sittin' on Go" is a song written by Rick Bowles and Josh Leo, and recorded by American country music singer Bryan White.  It was released in February 1997 as the fourth and final single from his album Between Now and Forever.  The song reached the top of the Billboard Hot Country Singles & Tracks (now Hot Country Songs) chart, giving White his fourth and final Number One single.

Content
The song is an up-tempo in which the narrator is addressing his lover, who is reluctant to begin a relationship with him. The narrator, who wants to begin the relationship, tells her that he is ready for her to give in, and is "sittin' on go" until she is ready.

The verses are in the key of A major, with a modulation upward to B major on the chorus.

Critical reception
Robert Eisele of The Kansas City Star wrote that the song was "easily digested and just as easily forgotten."
A review of the song in Radio & Records wrote that "Judicious use of an electric guitar's whammy bar opens the latest hook-laden single".

Chart positions
"Sittin' on Go" debuted at number 75 on the U.S. Billboard Hot Country Singles & Tracks for the chart week of March 1, 1997.

Year-end charts

Personnel
The following musicians played on this track.
Eddie Bayers – drums, percussion
Paul Franklin – pedal steel guitar
Brent Mason – electric guitar
Steve Nathan – organ
John Wesley Ryles – background vocals
Billy Joe Walker, Jr. – acoustic guitar
Bryan White - lead vocals, background vocals
Dennis Wilson – background vocals
Glenn Worf – bass guitar, fuzz bass
Curtis Young – background vocals

References

1997 singles
Bryan White songs
Songs written by Josh Leo
Song recordings produced by Kyle Lehning
Song recordings produced by Billy Joe Walker Jr.
Asylum Records singles
Songs written by Rick Bowles
1996 songs